This article discusses osteopathic physicians practising medicine in Canada, for non-physician osteopathic practitioners, see Osteopathy in Canada.

Osteopathic medicine in Canada is similar to conventional medicine in Canada, with the addition of osteopathic manipulation to diagnose and treat patients. Osteopathic physicians hold equal practice rights to non-osteopathic physicians (MDs) in Canada. North American osteopathic medicine requires an osteopathic physician to be trained and receive the Doctor of Osteopathic Medicine degree granted by a College of Osteopathic Medicine accredited by the American Osteopathic Association.

The Canadian Osteopathic Association (COA) represents osteopathic physicians registered for medical practice across Canada, and the Canadian Osteopathic Medical Student Association (COMSA) is the affiliated student organization. In Canada, the titles "osteopath" and "osteopathic physician" are protected in some provinces by the medical regulatory college for physicians and surgeons. As of 2011, there were approximately 20 U.S.-trained osteopathic physicians, all of whom held a Doctor of Osteopathic Medicine degree, practising in all of Canada. As of 2014, no training programs have been established for osteopathic physicians in Canada. Currently, there are no DO programs outside the United States. DO programs are accredited by the Commission on Osteopathic College Accreditation (COCA) of the American Osteopathic Association. The authority for licensure of osteopathic physicians lies with the provincial Colleges of Physicians and Surgeons.

Licensing requirements for osteopathic physicians
This is a summary of the licensing requirements of osteopathic physicians in Canada:

The Canadian Osteopathic Association started the Canadian Osteopathic Medical Student Association in 2011.

See also
Canadian Osteopathic Association
Doctor of Osteopathic Medicine
Osteopathic medicine in the United States
Osteopathy in Canada

References

External links
 Canadian Osteopathic Association 
 British Columbia Osteopathic Association 
 Ontario Federation of Osteopathic Professionals 

.
Healthcare in Canada
Medical education in Canada